Huntsville High School (HHS) is a small secondary school situated in Huntsville, Ontario, Canada, and is located on 58 Brunel Road. The school was built in 1955 and has since undergone two extensive additions. The school provides grades 9-12 education for all of Huntsville.

Former pupils
Dan Roycroft, 2006 Olympic skier
Hawksley Workman, Juno award-winning popular musician
Dara Howell, 2014 Olympic Gold Medalist in Slopestyle Skiing

Athletics
Huntsville High School has a number of different sports teams running in the fall, winter, and spring, and in particular its Nordic skiing program. Athletes and teams from the Nordic skiing program have won OFSAA championships on numerous occasions and many alumni have gone on to compete at the university, national, and international scene.

See also
List of high schools in Ontario

References

External links
Huntsville High School

High schools in the District Municipality of Muskoka
Huntsville, Ontario
Educational institutions established in 1955
1955 establishments in Ontario